Prince Mohammad Hossein Mirza Firouz (1894–1983) KCVO (1919) was an Iranian prince of the Qajar dynasty. He was son of Prince Abdol-Hossein Mirza Farmanfarma and Princess Ezzat-ed-Dowleh daughter of Mozaffar al-Din Shah.

Biography
He was educated privately in Tehran and Tabriz. At the age of 12, he was sent with his elder brother, Firouz Mirza to Paris. In Paris he attended Lycee Janson de Sailly. He also studied at the military academies of Russia. He joined the Russian Army and served during World War I. Firouz returned to Persia after the Russian revolution. He was Governor-General of Fars 1941-1942 and Minister for Roads and Communications 1945-1946.

Government Positions Held
 Chief of military mission to India, 1942
 Governor-General of Fars (1st time), 1941–1942
 Governor-General of Fars (2nd time), 1944–1945
 Chief of military mission to the North African front, 1943
 Minister of Roads and Communications, 1945–1946

Honours
 Grand Cross of the Order of the Crown of Belgium (1919)
 Order of the Legion of Honour

Qajar princes
1894 births
1983 deaths
Farmanfarmaian family
Russian military personnel of World War I
19th-century Iranian politicians
Iranian expatriates in Russia
19th-century Iranian military personnel
Imperial Iranian Army brigadier generals